Diglymma is a genus of beetles in the family Carabidae, containing the following species:

 Diglymma castigatum Broun, 1909
 Diglymma clivinoides (Castelnau, 1868)
 Diglymma marginale Broun, 1914
 Diglymma obtusum (Broun, 1893)

References

Nothobroscina
Carabidae genera